"What in XXXTarnation" (sometimes stylized as "WHAT IN XXXTARNATION!?") is a song by American rapper XXXTentacion featuring fellow American rapper Ski Mask the Slump God. The song was released as a single for the Members Only mixtape Members Only, Vol. 3. It was produced by STAIN.

Background 
"What in XXXTarnation" was first released on XXXTentacion's SoundCloud account on April 17, 2017, along with three other songs and was released as a single on April 20, 2017. Throughout the song, X and Ski Mask the Slump God make satirical threats towards their enemies. The song was described as the "rap version of a fart joke" on an XXL article listing their top XXXTentacion songs. In 2019, Ski Mask himself sampled the song in his single "Carbonated Water".

Personnel 
Credits adapted from Genius.

 XXXTentacion – primary artist, songwriter
 Ski Mask the Slump God – featured artist, songwriter
 STAIN – producer, songwriter

External links

References 

2017 singles
2017 songs
XXXTentacion songs
Ski Mask the Slump God songs
Songs written by XXXTentacion
Empire Distribution singles

Comedy rap songs